Khaneh Zenyan (also Romanized as Khāneh Zenyān and Khāneh-ye Zenyān; also known as Khān-e Zenyān and Khān-i-Ziniān) is a city in Qarah Chaman Rural District, Arzhan District, Shiraz County, Fars Province, Iran. At the 2006 census, its population was 1,578, in 350 families.

Climate

References 

Populated places in Shiraz County
Cities in Fars Province